Imperial distillery was a producer of single malt Scotch whisky located in Carron, Speyside that operated sporadically between 1897 and 1998. Imperial was mothballed and reopened several times in its hundred-year history. The only official bottling was a 15-year expression, released in the mid 1990s. The distillery was demolished in 2013 and a new distillery, Dalmunach, established on the site in 2015.

References

1897 establishments in Scotland
2000 disestablishments in Scotland
Companies of Scotland
Scottish malt whisky
Distilleries in Scotland
British companies disestablished in 2000
British companies established in 1897
Buildings and structures demolished in 2013
Demolished buildings and structures in Scotland